Neermanvi  is a village in the southern state of Karnataka, India. It is located in the Manvi taluk of Raichur district in Karnataka.

Demographics
 India census, Neermanvi had a population of 6427 with 3221 males and 3206 females.

See also
 Raichur
 Districts of Karnataka

References

External links
 http://Raichur.nic.in/

Villages in Raichur district
Tourist attractions in Raichur district
 Hindu temples in Raichur district